KBWE (91.9 FM, "Voz Latina KBWE 91.9 FM") is a radio station licensed to serve the community of Burley, Idaho. The station is owned by Tu Voz, Inc., and airs a bilingual Spanish/English community radio format.

The station was assigned the KBWE call letters by the Federal Communications Commission on May 18, 2011.

References

External links
 Official Website
 FCC Public Inspection File for KBWE
 

BWE
Radio stations established in 2012
2012 establishments in Idaho
Community radio stations in the United States
Spanish-language radio stations in the United States
Cassia County, Idaho
Minidoka County, Idaho